Erich Everth (born 3 July 187? in Berlin; died 22 June 1934 in Leipzig) was a German art historian, journalist and scientist of newspaper and cultivation. He was the first ordinary professor for Journalism in Germany and directed from 1926 to 1933 the Institute for Journalism at the University of Leipzig. Alongside Otto Groth and Emil Dovifat Everth is one of the greatest German scientists for Journalism. With the Rise to power of the Nazis 1933 he was forced to retire and died soon after in sickness and bitterness.

Life and work

Studies 
Everth had remarkably many directions of interest. In 1898 he matriculated himself at the Friedrich-Wilhelms-Universität and studied philosophy and law. Later he changed to philosophy,  art history and psychology. His most important teacher was Max Dessoir, who was struggling with the concept of a new systematic  Science of Art.

Everth received a PhD in 1909  at the philosophical department of the University of Leipzig by August Schmarsow and Johannes Volkelt.

Journalism 
Everth then worked for different newspapers, such as the Rheinisch-Westfälische Zeitung or the Magdeburgische Zeitung.

After the break-out of World War I Everth was a soldier at the eastern front.  Soon he gained a role as consultant in the press office of Ober Ost and found time for publications again.  In 1915 Everth published the pamphlet Von der Seele der Soldaten im Felde (About the soul of the soldier afield), which rapidly became one of the most dispersed texts under the German soldiers. No less than 20,000 brochures were printed in 4 editions. In contrast to usual pamphlets full of chauvinism and heroism, Everth characterized the active soldier as a normal human being with problems and individual worries. Hermann Hesse appreciated in a review exactly this fine psychological sight of Erich Everth.

After the war Everth worked in editorial departments of different newspapers, as there are the Leipziger Volkszeitung, the Berliner „Telegraphen Union“, the Vossische Zeitung, the Deutsche Allgemeine Zeitung or the liberal Berliner Tageblatt.

He published numerous articles on a wide spectrum of matters.  He wrote essays or shorter texts on occasion.  They confirm, what the political angle of the different editorial office already suggested: Everth had changed his political views from a monarchic-national to advocacy of democracy.

"Zeitungskunde": the first full professor 
In November 1926, the 48-year-old art historian was appointed by Karl Bücher to be the first ordinary professor of the newly created chair for "Zeitungskunde" at the University of Leipzig. His concern was the methodological basement of the new academic discipline. Everth defined Zeitungskunde/Journalism as a discipline of integration without a special method. In fact it is for him possible to use different methods from other disciplines in various combinations.
He restricted the object of "Zeitungskunde" to the newspaper, that means every printed periodical press.
This press meets in Everths opinion not only economic but equally social needs in public life. The press is more than just a usual earning company but at least in parts has its own spirit and is partially a piece of art itself.

As a result of the university's affiliation with state ideology during the Nazi era, the institute saw significant personnel and content changes, and Erich Everth, the former head and a proponent of a free press, was ousted and replaced by regime loyalist Hans A. Münster.

Fight against Nazism
When the Nazis rose to power in 1933 all the newspapers of the Nazis celebrated in capital letters. But the national press was celebrating as well, the German media proprietor Alfred Hugenberg himself was the leader of the  DNVP, a party that was supporting the Nazis.

In this concert of like-minded there were few who intoned other melodies. And even less, that know how these concertos can end. To those belonged Everth, „a man of the more inconvenient sort, who was concerned for the Freedom of the press at first – a concern that should cost him  his career and honour and probably even his will to live“ (Arnulf Kutsch). The reclusive worker Everth now takes a firm stand and shows that he is not going to stay inside the ivory tower of Academic elitism due to the incidents.

The Congress „Das Freie Wort“ (The Free Word) 
On the very last, from liberal und lefts-democratic politicians organised public event in central Berlin, the congress „Das Freie Wort“ (The Free Word) on  February 19, 1933, Everth held a strong pleading in favor of the freedom of the press. He joined Alfred Kantorowicz in the opinion, that „there are times, when the free word has to be defended not only with words, but with deeds.“ 
At this demonstration, where one could hear the call for freedom of thought for a last time, between 1000 and 2000 democratic or at least anti-Nazi minded intellectuals participated, for instance  Käthe Kollwitz, Max Brauer, Willi Münzenberg, Adolf Grimme, Ferdinand Tönnies and Heinrich Mann. Albert Einstein composed a public appeal for attendance on February 6. 
Before normal termination the demonstration was ended by SA violently. A few days later, on the other side of the plaza, the Reichstag was ablaze and the hereupon enforced Reichstag Fire Decree nullified many of the key civil liberties of German citizens.

Unsubstantiated dismissal 
Political investigations against Everth were initiated then. A short period of time later he got a letter from the Saxon Ministry of Education, which stated that Everths attitude was "in no way compatible with the requirements that must be made to an academic teacher in the new state." On April 29, 1933, Everth was dismissed for supposedly "un-german" attitude. An explanatory statement that must have been especially devastating for the germanophile Everth. But he was the only one of the whole academic guild that had the courage to criticize the emergency regulations and the press policy of the Nazis. 
Everths forced retirement followed by September 30, 1933, although the investigation had revealed no justiciable evidence against him.

Disease and end 
At the time of the forced retirement Everth was already seriously ill. Further resistance was therefore impossible for him. 
Everth, who had drawn all his life to the events underlying spiritual connections, who always focused more on the whole as to the little detail, must have been suffering particularly hard under the ever growing National Socialist "movement" and her brown aesthetics.

The dignified psychological observation, and the interdisciplinary view were Everths concern and talent. From this grew its Weltanschauung as well as the basic idea of his scientific theory. His sense of order had nothing in common with the designers and heralds of a Third Reich.

While the Nazis distinguished themselves on the streets by rampaging hordes of SA and in communication policy by censorship and rushing propaganda, Everth fought to the last with all his might. But it remained existentially incomprehensible for him, who now directed the fate of the German nation, especially since he had no illusions about their future under Adolf Hitlers rule. The cause of his illness and fast death are therefore definitely also to find in that social development of Germany. Everth himself noted this fact in one of his last letters.

When Erich Everth died on 22 June 1934 in Leipzig, the long List of Victims of National Socialism got another entry.

Tribute 
Since 2003 Leipzig's Media Foundation awards a scholarship named after Everth that so far has been used within the Department of Communication and Media Studies at the University of Leipzig.

References

Sources

Writings 
Männer der Zeit, Faber, Magdeburg 1915 (zuerst in der Magdeburgischen Zeitung, 1915)
Von der Seele des Soldaten im Felde. Bemerkungen eines Kriegsteilnehmers, Diederichs, Jena 1915
Das innere Deutschland nach dem Kriege, Diederichs, Jena 1916
Conrad Ferdinand Meyer. Dichtung und Persönlichkeit, Sibyllen-Verlag, Dresden 1924
Die Kunst der Erzählung, in: Zeitschrift für Ästhetik und allgemeine Kunstwissenschaft, Bd. IX, Enke, Stuttgart 1925
Volkelts ästhetische Grundgestalten, Eduard Pfeiffer, Leipzig 1926
Zeitungskunde und Universität. Antrittsvorlesung, gehalten am 20. November 1926, Gustav Fischer, Jena 1927
Die Zeitung im Dienst der Öffentlichkeit. Eine begriffliche Grundlegung, in: Archiv für Buchgewerbe und Gebrauchsgraphik, 1928
Das Studium der Zeitungskunde an der Universität Leipzig, A. Lorenz, Leipzig 1928 (2. Auflage 1933)
Die Öffentlichkeit in der Außenpolitik von Karl V. bis Napoleon. Gustav Fischer, Jena 1931

Literature 
Stefanie Averbeck: Erich Everth: Theorie der Öffentlichkeit und Interessen. In: Großbothener Vorträge III. edition lumière, Bremen 2002
Hans Bohrmann, Arnulf Kutsch: Pressegeschichte und Pressetheorie. Erich Everth 1878–1934. in: Publizistik 24 (1979), S. 386–403
Erik Koenen: Ein „einsamer“ Wissenschaftler? Erich Everth und das Leipziger Institut für Zeitungskunde zwischen 1926 und 1933. Ein Beitrag zur Bedeutung des Biographischen für die Geschichte der Zeitungswissenschaft. In: Medien & Zeit, 20. Jg. 2005, Heft 1, S. 38–50
Erik Koenen: Journalismus als soziale Form gedacht. Zum 70. Todestag von Erich Everth. In: Journal Universität Leipzig. Mitteilungen und Berichte für die Angehörigen und Freunde der Universität, Jg. 2004, Heft 4 (Juli), S. 28
Roland Lambrecht: Politische Entlassungen der NS-Zeit. Leipzig, Evangelische Verlagsanstalt, 2006.  
Arnulf Kutsch: Von der unbequemen Sorte. In: message 2/2002
Sylvia Werther, Thomas Lietz, Erik Koenen: Das Aus für das freie Wort. Die nationalsozialistische „Machtergreifung“ im Institut für Zeitungskunde. In: Journal Universität Leipzig. Mitteilungen und Berichte für die Angehörigen und Freunde der Universität Leipzig, Jg. 2003, Heft 7 (Dezember), S. 37–38

External links 
 
 Erich Everth in the 
 https://web.archive.org/web/20071008125322/http://www.exil-archiv.de/html/biografien/everth.htm
  
 Essay über den Medienstandort Leipzig

German art historians
1934 deaths
Year of birth uncertain
German male non-fiction writers